Andrew McFarland (Concord, New Hampshire, 14 July 1817 - Jacksonville, Illinois, 21 November 1891) was a United States physician.

Biography
He was the son of Concord clergyman Asa McFarland and his wife Elizabeth Kneeland McFarland. He attended Dartmouth College, and lectured at Jefferson Medical College in 1843. He practised at Sandwich and Laconia, New Hampshire, and was appointed superintendent of the New Hampshire Asylum for the Insane in August 1845. He resigned in November 1852, and practised at Concord, and Lawrence, Massachusetts. About 1854 he became superintendent of the Illinois State Asylum for the Insane in Jacksonville, serving in that position until 1869, when he resigned and established Oak Lawn Retreat, a private asylum in Jacksonville. He published The Escape (Boston, 1851). McFarland killed himself in 1891.

Legacy
His brother Asa was a noted New Hampshire journalist and politician. After graduation from medical school, his granddaughter, Anne Hazen McFarland, was at once was installed as Medical Superintendent of the Oak Lawn Sanitarium, thereby fulfilling the earnest desire of her grandfather, that she make a special study of the care of the insane.

References

Attribution

 
 

1817 births
1891 deaths
American psychiatrists
Dartmouth College alumni
Presidents of the American Psychiatric Association